Prince Șerban Constantin Cantacuzino (4 February 1941 – 4 July 2011) was a Romanian prince and actor, who appeared in more than a dozen television, film, and musical roles during his career. He was a descendant of Șerban Cantacuzino, the Prince of Wallachia from 1678 to 1688.

Born into Romanian nobility, Cantacuzino was a descendant of Șerban Cantacuzino, the Prince of Wallachia who supported the Ottoman Empire at the Battle of Vienna, published the Cantacuzino Bible and introduced corn to present-day Romania. His father, Ion Filotti Cantacuzino, was a screenwriter, doctor, film critic, film director, and producer.

Cantacuzino made his stage acting debut when he was 11 years old at the National Theatre Bucharest in the production, The Prince and the Beggar, opposite his grandmother, actress Maria Filotti. He starred in Richard III as Prince Edward at the Army Theater in Constanța in 1963. Cantacuzino co-starred with George Vraca in Richard III.

Cantacuzino moved to Paris, France, in 1990. He died in Paris on 4 July 2011, at the age of 70. His funeral was held at the Bellu Orthodox Cemetery in Bucharest, Romania.

Filmography

References

External links

1941 births
2011 deaths
20th-century Romanian male actors
Romanian male film actors
Romanian radio actors
Romanian male television actors
Romanian male stage actors
Nobility from Bucharest
Romanian princes
Romanian expatriates in France
Male actors from Paris
Male actors from Bucharest
Burials at Bellu Cemetery